M Special Unit, was a joint Allied special reconnaissance unit, part of the Services Reconnaissance Department (SRD), in the South West Pacific theatre of the Second World War. A joint Australian, New Zealand, Dutch and British military intelligence unit, it saw action in New Guinea and the Solomon Islands between 1943–1945, against the Empire of Japan.

History 
In 1943, M Special Unit was formed as a successor to the Coastwatchers, with the role of the unit was focused upon gathering intelligence on Japanese shipping and troop movements. To achieve this mission, small teams were landed behind enemy lines by sea, air or land insertion. This was in contrast to its counterpart, Z Special Unit, which became well known for its direct-action commando-style raids.

A notable member of M Special Unit was Sergeant Leonard Siffleet, who was executed after being taken prisoner during Operation Whiting in 1943. A photograph of Siffleet in his last moments achieved iconic status following the war.

M Special Unit was disbanded at the end of the war on 10 November 1945.

See also

 Z Special Unit
 Australian commandos
 Operation Locust
 Operation Whiting

Notes

References

 Horner, David. (1989). SAS Phantoms of the Jungle: A History of the Australian Special Air Service. Allen & Unwin: Sydney.  
 Roll of Honour for M Special Unit Members at Australian War Memorial

Military units and formations of Australia in World War II
Military units and formations established in 1943
Military units and formations disestablished in 1945
Special forces of Australia
Army reconnaissance units and formations